Stansted News Limited is a publishing company established in Bishop's Stortford, Hertfordshire in 1984.

Publications include:
Stansted Reporter: The company's first publication was a free-distribution magazine for employees at Stansted airport, called the Stansted Reporter. This was renamed as the Stansted Magazine in 1985, and continued to publish until 1988.
Fleet Operator Launched in 1988 as the official journal of the Association of Car Fleet Operators, and published until 2007
Business Air News Magazine launched in 1989 as European Business Air News, and currently produced twelve times each year in editions worldwide.
Global Business Jet Launched in 1999 and currently produced in the form of an annual Yearbook.
Business Air News Handbook Currently produced in the form of annual Handbooks for the EMEA region and for long-range business aviation.
Airframer Launched in 2005 and now the leading cross-reference directory of the aerospace supply chain.
Infant and Infant Grapevine journal and magazine for professionals in neonatal baby care.

External links 
 Business Air News
 Airframer
 Infant journal

Publishing companies of the United Kingdom